Malakar is a Bengali Hindu surname spread throughout West Bengal and Bangladesh and also in some parts of Assam, Jharkhand and Tripura. Malakars are traditionally garlander by trade.They are one of the fourteen castes belonging to 'Nabasakh' group.

Origin 
Malakars lived around Dhaka and other smaller towns of Bengal. The origin of the word Malakar came from Sanskrit. It is a Sandhi of mala and akar, which means a person who shapes mala, i.e a garlander. They are expert shola craftsmen.

People  with the surname 
 Bijoy Malakar, Indian politician
 Bishnu Malakar (born 1959), Nepalese boxer
 Sanjaya Malakar (born 1989), American singer
 Shrabonti Malakar (born 1987), Indian actress

References 

Bengali-language surnames
Hindu surnames
Bengali Hindu surnames